Racinaea ghiesbreghtii is a plant species in the genus Racinaea. This species is native to Mexico.

References

ghiesbreghtii
Flora of Mexico